Joseph Michael Straczynski (born July 17, 1954) is an American filmmaker and comic book writer. He is the founder of Synthetic Worlds Ltd. and Studio JMS and is best known as the creator of the science fiction television series Babylon 5 (1993–1998) and its spinoff Crusade (1999), as well as the series Jeremiah (2002–2004) and Sense8 (2015–2018). He is also the executor of the estate of Harlan Ellison.

Straczynski wrote the psychological drama film Changeling (2008) and was co-writer on the martial arts thriller Ninja Assassin (2009), was one of the key writers for (and had a cameo in) Marvel's Thor (2011), as well as the horror film Underworld: Awakening (2012), and the apocalyptic horror film World War Z (2013).

From 2001 to 2007, Straczynski wrote Marvel Comics' The Amazing Spider-Man, followed by runs on Thor and Fantastic Four. He is also the author of the Superman: Earth One trilogy of graphic novels, and he has written Superman, Wonder Woman, and Before Watchmen for DC Comics. Straczynski is the creator and writer of several original comic book series such as Rising Stars, Midnight Nation, Dream Police, and Ten Grand through Joe's Comics.

A prolific writer across a variety of media and former journalist, Straczynski is the author of the autobiography Becoming Superman (2019) for HarperVoyager, the novel Together We Will Go (2021) for Simon & Schuster, and Becoming a Writer, Staying a Writer (2021) for Benbella Books.  In 2020 he was also named Head of the Creative Council for the comics publishing company Artists, Writers and Artisans.

Straczynski is a long-time participant in Usenet and other early computer networks, interacting with fans through various online forums (including GEnie, CompuServe, and America Online) since 1984. He is credited as being the first TV producer to directly engage with fans on the Internet and to allow viewer viewpoints to influence the look and feel of his show (see Babylon 5s use of the Internet). Two prominent areas where he had a presence were GEnie and the newsgroup rec.arts.sf.tv.babylon5.moderated.

Personal life
Straczynski was born in Paterson, New Jersey, and is the son of Charles Straczynski, a manual laborer, and Evelyn Straczynski (née Pate). He was raised in Newark, New Jersey; Kankakee, Illinois; Dallas, Texas; Chula Vista, California, where he graduated from high school; and San Diego, California. Straczynski's family religion was Catholic, and he has Polish ancestry. His grandparents lived in the area which today belongs to Belarus and fled to America from the Russian Revolution; his father was born in the United States and has lived in Poland, Germany and Russia.

Straczynski is a graduate of Southwestern College and San Diego State University (SDSU), having earned an AA and later an honorary degree from Southwestern, where he was mentored by Professor Bill Virchis, and a BA with a double major in psychology and sociology (with minors in philosophy and literature) from San Diego State. While at SDSU, he wrote for the student newspaper, The Daily Aztec  at times penning so many articles that the paper was jokingly referred to as the "Daily Joe".

Straczynski met Kathryn M. Drennan while they were both at SDSU. They moved to Los Angeles in 1981 (where he still resides), married in 1983, separated in 1999, and they were divorced in 2001.   Sometime after his separation from Drennan, Straczynski entered into a relationship with Patricia Tallman, whom he had met when she was acting in his 1990s series Babylon 5. She served as CEO and executive producer of Studio JMS in partnership with him; both their relationship and partnership ended in 2013.

Straczynski has Asperger syndrome.

Career

1970s–1980s

Early work 
Straczynski began writing plays, having several produced at Southwestern College and San Diego State University before publishing his adaptation of "Snow White" with Performance Publishing. Several other plays were produced around San Diego, including "The Apprenticeship" for the Marquis Public Theater. During the late 1970s, Straczynski also became the on-air entertainment reviewer for KSDO-FM and wrote several radio plays before being hired as a scriptwriter for the radio drama Alien Worlds.  He also produced his first television project in San Diego, "Marty Sprinkle" for KPBS-TV as well as worked on the XETV-TV project Disasterpiece Theatre. He worked as a journalist for the Los Angeles Times as a special San Diego correspondent and also worked for San Diego Magazine and The San Diego Reader, and wrote for the Los Angeles Herald-Examiner, the Los Angeles Reader, TV-Cable Week, and People magazine. Straczynski wrote The Complete Book of Scriptwriting for Writer's Digest. Published in 1982, the book is often used as a text in introductory screenwriting courses, and is now in its third edition.

He and Kathryn M. Drennan, whom he met at San Diego State, moved to Los Angeles on April 1, 1981. They married in 1983 and separated in 2002. He spent five years from 1987 to 1992 co-hosting the Hour 25 radio talk show on KPFK-FM Los Angeles with Larry DiTillio. During his tenure, he interviewed John Carpenter, Neil Gaiman, Ray Bradbury, Harlan Ellison and other writers, producers, actors and directors. In 2000, Straczynski returned to radio drama with  The City of Dreams for scifi.com. Straczynski is the author of three horror novels—Demon Night, Othersyde, and Tribulations—and nearly twenty short stories, many of which are collected in two compilations—Tales from the New Twilight Zone and Straczynski Unplugged.

Work in animation 
Straczynski was a fan of the cartoon He-Man and the Masters of the Universe.  He wrote a spec script in 1984 and sent it directly to Filmation.  They purchased his script, bought several others, and hired him on staff.  During this time he became friends with Larry DiTillio, and when Filmation produced the He-Man spinoff She-Ra: Princess of Power, they both worked as story editors on the show.  However, when Filmation refused to give them credit on-screen, both left, finding work with DIC on Jayce and the Wheeled Warriors.

Straczynski and DiTillio also worked to create an animated version of Elfquest, but that project fell through when CBS attempted to retool the show to appeal to younger audiences.

While working on Jayce, Straczynski was hired to come aboard the Len Janson and Chuck Menville project to adapt the movie Ghostbusters to an animated version called The Real Ghostbusters.  When Janson and Menville learned that there was not only a 13-episode order but a 65-episode syndication order as well, they decided that the workload was too much and that they would only work on their own scripts.  DIC head Jean Chalopin asked Straczynski to take on the task of story editing the entire 78-episode block as well as writing his own scripts. After the show's successful first season, consultants were brought in to make suggestions for the show, including changing Janine to a more maternal character, giving every character a particular "job" (Peter is the funny one, Egon is the smart one, and Winston, the only black character, was to be the driver), and to add kids into the show.  Straczynski left at this point, Janson and Menville resuming the story editing job for the second network season.  Straczynski then began development on a show called Spiral Zone but left after only one script, taking his name off the series, because management drastically altered his conception of show. substituting the pseudonym "Fettes Grey" (derived from the names of the grave robbers in The Body Snatcher)

Straczynski also wrote for CBS Storybreak, writing an adaptation of Evelyn Sibley Lampman's The Shy Stegosaurus of Cricket Creek.

Live action and network shows 
After leaving animation, Straczynski freelanced for The Twilight Zone writing an episode entitled ("What Are Friends For") and, for Shelley Duvall's Nightmare Classics, adaptating The Strange Case of Dr. Jekyll and Mr. Hyde, which was nominated for a Writer's Guild Award.

Straczynski was then offered the position of story editor on the syndicated live-action science fiction series Captain Power and the Soldiers of the Future.  Straczynski constructed a season long arc with lasting character changes and wrote a third of the scripts himself.  After one season, the toy company Mattel demanded more input into the show, causing Straczynski to quit.  He recommended DiTillio to take over the job as story editor for a second season, but the toy company financing fell through and that season was never produced.

Soon after, the 1988 Writers Guild of America strike began. Straczynski met Harlan Ellison during this time and later became friends with him. Straczynski is an executor of Ellison's collected works.

After the strike ended, the producers of the new Twilight Zone needed to create more episodes to be able to sell the series into syndication with a complete 65-episode package.  They hired Straczynski as executive story editor to fill in the remaining number of needed episodes. Straczynski wrote many of the scripts himself. In addition, one episode, "Crazy as a Soup Sandwich", was written by Ellison.

After leaving Twilight Zone, his agent of the time asked him to pitch for the show Jake and the Fatman.  Initially wary, Straczynski finally did and was hired on as an executive story consultant under Jeri Taylor and David Moessinger.  When Taylor and Moessinger left the show, Straczynski left too as an act of solidarity.

When Moessinger was hired as executive producer for Murder, She Wrote, he offered Straczynski a job as co-producer. Straczynski joined Murder for two seasons and wrote seven produced episodes.  Moessinger and Straczynski moved the protagonist, Jessica Fletcher, from the sleepy Maine town of Cabot Cove to New York City to revitalize the show.  The move effectively brought the show back into the top ten from the mid-thirties where it had fallen.  Straczynski made Jessica an instructor in writing and criminology, and he emphasized her role as a working writer, with all the deadlines and problems involved in that profession.

Straczynski also wrote one episode of Walker, Texas Ranger for Moessinger between the pilot episode for Babylon 5 and the start of its first season.

Straczynski  wrote an adaptation of Robert Louis Stevenson's The Strange Case of Dr. Jekyll and Mr. Hyde for the Showtime network, which was nominated for a Writers Guild of America award, and a Murder, She Wrote movie, Murder, She Wrote: A Story to Die For, which he produced.

1990s

Babylon 5 and Crusade 
In late 1991, Warner Bros. contracted with Straczynski and Doug Netter as partners to produce Babylon 5 as the flagship program for the new Prime Time Entertainment Network.

Straczynski and Netter hired many of the people from Captain Power, as well as hiring Ellison as a consultant and DiTillio as a story editor.  Babylon 5 won two Emmy Awards, back-to-back Hugo Awards, and dozens of other awards. Straczynski wrote 92 of the 110 episodes, as well as the pilot and five television movies.  The show is a character-driven space opera and features an intentional emphasis on realism in its portrayal of space operations. It also pioneered extensive use of CGI for its special effects.  Babylon 5 was produced and broadcast for five seasons completing Stracynski's planned story arc. Its sequel, Crusade, was produced for the TNT Network, however it ended with only 13 episodes. Production was halted before the first episode aired.

He wrote the outlines for nine of the canonical Babylon 5 novels, supervised the three produced B5 telefilm novelizations (In the Beginning, Thirdspace, and A Call to Arms), and is the author of four Babylon 5 short stories published in magazines, not yet reprinted.

In 2005, Straczynski began publishing his Babylon 5 scripts. This process ended in June 2008, with the scripts no longer being available from the end of July of that year. His scripts for the television movies were published for a limited time in January 2009.

Straczynski also wrote and produced the pilot Babylon 5: The Legend of the Rangers, a pilot for the SciFi Network, and wrote, directed and produced Babylon 5: The Lost Tales as a two-hour direct-to-DVD movie.

Joe's Comics 
Straczynski has long been a comic fan and began writing comics in the late 1980s. His work in comics includes the adaptations of Captain Power and the Soldiers of the Future, The Twilight Zone, Star Trek and Babylon 5. In 1999 he created Rising Stars for Top Cow/Image Comics. Eventually he worked mostly under his own imprint – Joe's Comics – for which he wrote the Midnight Nation miniseries and the illustrated fantasy parable Delicate Creatures.

2000s

Marvel Comics 
Marvel Comics then signed him to an exclusive contract, beginning with a run on The Amazing Spider-Man, from 2001 to 2007. He took over the series with Volume 2 issue #30 (cover dated June 2001). Straczynski and artist John Romita Jr. crafted an acclaimed story for The Amazing Spider-Man #36 (Dec. 2001) in response to the September 11 attacks. He wrote or co-wrote several major Spider-Man story arcs including "Spider-Man: The Other", "Back in Black", and "One More Day". He later wrote several other Marvel titles including Supreme Power, Strange, Fantastic Four, Thor, and mini-series featuring the Silver Surfer and a "What If" scenario, Bullet Points.

Jeremiah 
Straczynski also ran Jeremiah, loosely based on the Belgian post-apocalyptic comic of the same name, from 2002–2004.  Straczynski ran the series for two seasons but was frustrated with the conflicting directions that MGM and Showtime wanted from the show, and even used the pseudonym "Fettes Grey" for the first time since Spiral Zone on one of the scripts.  In the second season, Straczynski decided to leave the show if things did not improve, and the show ended after two seasons.

Changeling 
Straczynski wrote Changeling, a psychological drama film based partly on the "Wineville Chicken Coop" kidnapping and murder case in Los Angeles, California. Directed by Clint Eastwood, produced by Ron Howard, and starring Angelina Jolie, the film premiered in 2008 and subsequently received eight nominations for the BAFTA Award, including a nomination for Best Original Screenplay. The first draft script was written in eleven days, after Straczynski figured out "how to tell" the story, which ended up being the shooting draft, after Eastwood declined to make any changes. It was optioned immediately by Howard, who at first intended to direct the film but later stepped down after scheduling conflicts.

At first, Straczynski expressed disbelief at the story, but spent a year researching the case, compiling over six thousands pages of documentation. Straczynski claimed that 95% of the script's content came from the historical record, and went through the script with Universal's legal department, providing attribution for every scene so the film would be described as "a true story" rather than "based on" one. On how his journalistic background helped him write the film, Straczynski stated:

Feature screenwriter 
Straczynski announced on February 23, 2007, that he had been hired to write the feature film adaptation of Max Brooks's New York Times-bestselling novel World War Z for Paramount Pictures and Brad Pitt's production company, Plan B, taking screen story credit on the finished film.

In 2008, Straczynski wrote a draft of Ninja Assassin for Joel Silver, which he completed in just 53 hours. The film was produced by the Wachowskis and released on November 25, 2009.

Straczynski is credited as "story writer" along with Mark Protosevich for the 2011 film, Thor. He also makes a cameo appearance in the film, his first appearance in a movie and his second appearance as an actor (the first being "Sleeping in Light", the final episode of Babylon 5). Straczynski was part of the writers room (along with Terry Rossio, Patrick McKay, J. D. Payne, Lindsey Beer, Cat Vasko, T.S. Nowlin, and Jack Paglen) to develop Godzilla vs. Kong, though was uncredited on the final script.

DC Comics 
When his exclusive contract with Marvel ended, he was announced as the writer for a run on The Brave and the Bold for DC Comics. He collaborated with artist Shane Davis on an out-of-continuity original graphic novel starring Superman titled Superman: Earth One. The story features a young Superman and focus on his decision about the role he wants to assume in life. On March 8, 2010, it was announced he would be taking over writing duties for the monthly Superman title with a story arc entitled "Grounded", and the Wonder Woman title, beginning with issues 701 and 601 respectively. Less than a year later he was asked by DC to step away from both titles in order to concentrate on the second volume of Superman: Earth One and handed them over to Chris Roberson and Phil Hester to finish his Superman and Wonder Woman stories respectively. In 2012, Straczynski wrote Before Watchmen: Dr. Manhattan drawn by Adam Hughes and Before Watchmen: Nite Owl drawn by Andy Kubert and Joe Kubert. A second volume of Superman: Earth One was released later that same year.

At the San Diego Comic-Con in 2015, DC Comics announced The Flash: Earth One, a new graphic novel of its Earth One line to be written by Straczynski, set to be published in 2016.

2010s

Studio JMS 
In July 2012, J. Michael Straczynski announced the launch of Studio JMS to produce TV series, movies, comics and, down the road, games and web series. On March 27, 2013, Netflix announced they would produce the show Sense8 with Studio JMS and the Wachowskis, which aired on June 5, 2015, and earned a season 2 announcement by August 10, 2015.

Joe's Comics revival 
The Joe's Comics line was revived at Image Comics in 2013 with the launch of Ten Grand drawn by Ben Templesmith and Sidekick  drawn by Tom Mandrake.

Dynamite Entertainment announced in July 2013 a new 12 issue The Twilight Zone comic book series penned by Straczynski. The series ran for its projected 12 issues, from December 2013 to February 2015, with art by Guiu Vilanova. Straczynski was announced as the writer of Terminator Salvation: The Final Battle, a 12 issue comic book series from Dark Horse Comics, along with artist Pete Woods.

Sense8 
Sense8, a science fiction television series created by Straczynski and the Wachowskis was ordered straight-to-series by Netflix in March 2013. Sense8'''s first season debuted in June 2015 on Netflix, from Studio JMS and Georgeville Television. Straczynski executive produced and co-wrote all 12 episodes of the first season with fellow creators, executive producers, and directors Lilly and Lana Wachowski. In August 2015, Netflix renewed Sense8 for a second season.

 2020s 

 Artists Writers and Artisans 
In 2020 Straczynski was named head of the Creative Council for the new comics publishing company AWA, where he was responsible for creating the shared universe used by many of its writers.

Following the publication of his autobiography Becoming Superman in 2019 from HarperVoyager, the novel Together We Will Go was published in 2021 by Simon & Schuster's Scout Press, and Becoming A Writer, Staying A Writer was published in 2021 by Benbella Books.

 Unrealized projects 
In 2004, Straczynski was approached by Paramount Studios to become a producer of the Star Trek: Enterprise series. He declined, believing that he would not be allowed to take the show in the direction he felt it should go. He did write a treatment for a new Star Trek series with colleague Bryce Zabel.

After both Babylon 5 and Jeremiah ended, Straczynski transitioned to working as a feature film screenwriter. In 2006, he was hired to write a feature film based on the story of King David for Universal by producers Erwin Stoff and Akiva Goldsman. In June 2007, it was announced that Straczynski had written a feature screenplay for the Silver Surfer movie for Fox, the production of which would depend on the success of the Fantastic Four: Rise of the Silver Surfer. Additionally, he has written a script for Tom Hanks' Playtone Productions and Universal Pictures called They Marched into Sunlight based upon the Pulitzer nominated novel of the same name and an outline by Paul Greengrass, for Greengrass to direct, should it get a greenlight.

In June 2008, Daily Variety named Straczynski one of the top Ten Screenwriters to Watch. They announced Straczynski was writing Lensman for Ron Howard (to whom he had sold a screenplay entitled The Flickering Light), that he was selling another spec, Proving Ground, to Tom Cruise and United Artists. In October 2008, it was announced that Straczynski was engaged to pen a remake of the science fiction classic Forbidden Planet. In the fall of 2009, it was reported that Straczynski was writing a movie titled Shattered Union for Jerry Bruckheimer and Disney. The screenplay, based on the video game of that name, concerns itself with a present-day American civil war.

In October 2012, Valiant Entertainment announced a live-action feature film adaptation on its comic book series Shadowman, written and executive produced by Straczynski. The Flickering Light, Straczynski's directorial debut, was announced in February 2013, with the WWII drama set to be written and produced by Straczynski through his Studio JMS. Straczynski and Studio JMS optioned Harlan Ellison's short story "'Repent, Harlequin!' Said the Ticktockman", who granted the option only after reading a finished screenplay written by Straczynski.

On San Diego Comic-Con 2014, it was announced that Straczynski and Graphic India would team up with Chernin Entertainment to produce a feature film adaptation of his upcoming graphic novel Titans, to be written and produced by Straczynski, through Studio JMS.

Straczynski was also hired to adapt Red Mars for Spike TV, based on the Kim Stanley Robinson novels, with Vince Gerardis as producer. In December 2015, Spike TV gave a 10-episode straight-to-series order to Red Mars, set to premiere in January 2017, with Straczynski serving as writer, executive producer, and showrunner through Studio JMS, and production set to begin in Summer 2016. On March 25, 2016 Deadline reported that Straczynski had left his position as showrunner with Peter Noah replacing him but he too left due to creative differences with Spike. Spike has put the series on hold for further development.

On July 30, 2021, Straczynski expressed an interest in becoming showrunner of the BBC Television series Doctor Who, following the departure of Chris Chibnall, confirming his representatives had been contacting the BBC. On August 19, Straczynski confirmed contact had been made with the BBC, but that the organization had already begun their own selection process and were not seeking new candidates. On September 24, 2021, the BBC confirmed former showrunner Russell T Davies would return, which Straczynski commended.

Selected accolades

An asteroid, discovered in 1992 at the Kitt Peak National Observatory, was honorarily named 8379 Straczynski.

 Bibliography 

 Joe's Comics Rising Stars #1–24 (1999–2005)Midnight Nation #1–12 (2000–2002)

 Marvel Comics The Amazing Spider-Man vol. 2 #30–58, vol. 1 #500–545 (2001–2007)Supreme Power #1–18 (Marvel MAX, 2003–2006)Silver Surfer: Requiem #1–4 (Marvel Knights, 2007)Thor vol. 3 #1–12, vol. 1 #600–603, Giant-Size Finale #1 (2007–2009)Thor vol. 6 #24 (2022)

 DC Comics Superman: Earth One Volume 1–3 (2010–2015)Before Watchmen:Nite Owl #1–4 (2012)Dr. Manhattan'' #1–4 (2012)

Filmography

Film

Television

References

Further reading

External links

JMSNews

J. Michael Straczynski at B5races

 
 

 
 

 

 

 
 

 
 

1954 births
21st-century American novelists
21st-century American short story writers
21st-century American male writers
20th-century American screenwriters
21st-century American screenwriters
American comics writers
American horror writers
American male journalists
American male novelists
American male screenwriters
American male short story writers
American people of Polish descent
American science fiction writers
Television producers from California
American television writers
Babylon 5
Businesspeople from Newark, New Jersey
Hugo Award-winning writers
Inkpot Award winners
Journalists from California
Living people
American male television writers
Marvel Comics writers
Marvel Comics people
DC Comics people
People from Chula Vista, California
People from Kankakee, Illinois
Writers from San Diego
San Diego State University alumni
Usenet people
Writers from Newark, New Jersey
Writers from Paterson, New Jersey
Novelists from New Jersey
21st-century American non-fiction writers
Screenwriters from California
Television producers from Illinois
Screenwriters from Illinois
Television producers from New Jersey
American television directors
People with Asperger syndrome